Leucochrysa insularis is a species of green lacewing in the family Chrysopidae. It is found in the Caribbean Sea, Central America, and North America.

References

Further reading

 
 

Chrysopidae
Articles created by Qbugbot
Insects described in 1853